Svetlina may refer to:
 Svetlina, Sredets Municipality, a village in Sredets Municipality, Burgas Province, Bulgaria
 Svetlina, Dimitrovgrad Municipality, a village in Dimitrovgrad Municipality, Haskovo Province, Bulgaria
 Svetlina, Topolovgrad Municipality, a village in Topolovgrad Municipality, Haskovo Province, Bulgaria
 Svetlina AD, the name of two Bulgarian lighting manufacturing plants

See also 
 Svetlana (disambiguation)